The 2012 Pittsburgh Pirates season was the franchise's 126th season as a member of the National League, their 131st season overall, and their 12th season at PNC Park. Despite being 67–54 on August 19, the Pirates finished the season 79–83. This set a record for the longest losing season streak in all of North American professional sports history at 20.

The Pirates played just six extra inning games during the season, the fewest of any MLB team in 2012.

Game log 

|-  style="background:#fbb;"
| 1 || April 5 || Phillies || 0–1 || Halladay (1–0) || Bédard (0–1) || Papelbon (1) || 39,585 || 0–1
|-  style="background:#cfc;"
| 2 || April 7 || Phillies || 2–1 (10) || Cruz (1–0) || Blanton (0–1) || — || 38,885 || 1–1
|-  style="background:#cfc;"
| 3 || April 8 || Phillies || 5–4 || Hanrahan (1–0) || Herndon (0–1) || — || 19,856 || 2–1
|-  style="background:#fbb;"
| 4 || April 10 || @ Dodgers || 1–2 || Jansen (1–0) || Grilli (0–1) || Guerra (3) || 56,000 || 2–2
|-  style="background:#fbb;"
| 5 || April 11 || @ Dodgers || 1–4 || Billingsley (2–0) || Bédard (0–2) || Guerra (4) || 29,729 || 2–3
|-  style="background:#fbb;"
| 6 || April 12 || @ Dodgers || 2–3 || Capuano (1–0) || Karstens (0–1) || Guerra (5) || 28,328 || 2–4
|-  style="background:#fbb;"
| 7 || April 13 || @ Giants || 0–5 || Cain (1–0) || McDonald (0–1) || — || 41,138 || 2–5
|-  style="background:#fbb;"
| 8 || April 14 || @ Giants || 3–4 || López (1–0) || Resop (0–1) || — || 41,657 || 2–6
|-  style="background:#cfc;"
| 9 || April 15 || @ Giants || 4–1 || Correia (1–0) || Vogelsong (0–1) || Hanrahan (1) || 41,766 || 3–6
|-  style="background:#fbb;"
| 10 || April 16 || @ Diamondbacks || 1–5 || Saunders (1–0) || Bédard (0–3) || — || 17,366 || 3–7
|-  style="background:#cfc;"
| 11 || April 17 || @ Diamondbacks || 5–4 || Grilli (1–1) || Shaw (0–2) || Cruz (1) || 19,198 || 4–7
|-  style="background:#cfc;"
| 12 || April 18 || @ Diamondbacks || 2–1 || Lincoln (1–0) || Hudson (1–1) || Cruz (2) || 18,369 || 5–7
|-  style="background:#fbb;"
| 13 || April 20 || Cardinals || 1–4 || Lynn (3–0) || Morton (0–1) || Motte (3) || 23,509 || 5–8
|-  style="background:#cfc;"
| 14 || April 21 || Cardinals || 2–0 || Burnett (1–0) || Westbrook (2–1) || Hanrahan (2) || 25,218 || 6–8
|-  style="background:#fbb;"
| 15 || April 22 || Cardinals || 1–5 || Lohse (3–0) || Bédard (0–4) || — || 30,437 || 6–9
|-  style="background:#bbb;"
| — || April 23 || Rockies || colspan=6| Postponed (rain); Makeup: April 25
|-  style="background:#cfc;"
| 16 || April 24 || Rockies || 5–4 || Watson (1–0) || Belisle (1–1) || Hanrahan (3) || 10,484 || 7–9
|-  style="background:#fbb;"
| 17 || April 25 || Rockies || 1–2 || Reynolds (2–0) || Resop (0–2) || Betancourt (6) || N/A || 7–10
|-  style="background:#cfc;"
| 18 || April 25 || Rockies || 5–1 || Morton (1–1) || Chacín (0–2) || — || 15,218 || 8–10
|-  style="background:#fbb;"
| 19 || April 27 || @ Braves || 1–6 || Hanson (3–2) || Burnett (1–1) || Medlen (1) || 36,215 || 8–11 
|-  style="background:#cfc;"
| 20 || April 28 || @ Braves || 4–2 || Bédard (1–4) || Delgado (2–2) || Hanrahan (4) || 34,086 || 9–11
|-  style="background:#fbb;"
| 21 || April 29 || @ Braves || 3–4 || Hudson (1–0) || Correia (1–1) || Kimbrel (8) || 30,419 || 9–12
|-  style="background:#cfc;"
| 22 || April 30 || @ Braves || 9–3 || McDonald (1–1) || Minor (2–2) || — || 17,181 || 10–12
|-

|-  style="background:#fbb;"
| 23 || May 1 || @ Cardinals || 7–10 || Wainwright (1–3) || Morton (1–2) || Motte (4) || 36,345 || 10–13
|-  style="background:#fbb;"
| 24 || May 2 || @ Cardinals || 3–12 || Lynn (5–0) || Burnett (1–2) || — || 35,987 || 10–14
|-  style="background:#cfc;"
| 25 || May 3 || @ Cardinals || 6–3 || Bédard (2–4) || Westbrook (3–2) || — || 40,601 || 11–14
|-  style="background:#fbb;"
| 26 || May 4 || Reds || 1–6 || Cueto (4–0) || Correia (1–2) || — || 20,445 || 11–15
|-  style="background:#cfc;"
| 27 || May 5 || Reds || 3–2 || McDonald (2–1)  || Leake (0–4) || Hanrahan (5) || 33,019 || 12–15
|-  style="background:#fbb;"
| 28 || May 6 || Reds || 0–5 || Latos (2–2) || Morton (1–3) || — || 20,042 || 12–16
|-  style="background:#cfc;"
| 29 || May 8 || Nationals || 5–4 || Watson (2–0) || Rodríguez (1–2) || — || 10,323 || 13–16
|-  style="background:#cfc;"
| 30 || May 9 || Nationals || 4–2 || Lincoln (2–0) || Detwiler (3–2) || Hanrahan (6) || 11,478 || 14–16
|-  style="background:#fbb;"
| 31 || May 10 || Nationals || 2–4 || Strasburg (3–0) || Correia (1–3) || Rodríguez (7) || 15,381 || 14–17
|-  style="background:#fbb;"
| 32 || May 11 || Astros || 0–1 || Norris (3–1) || McDonald (2–2) || Myers (9) || 19,878 || 14–18
|-  style="background:#cfc;"
| 33 || May 12 || Astros || 5–2 || Morton (2–3) || Happ (2–3) || Cruz (3) || 34,187 || 15–18
|-  style="background:#cfc;"
| 34 || May 13 || Astros || 3–2 (12) || Watson (3–0) || Rodriguez (1–4) || — || 27,517 || 16–18
|-  style="background:#cfc;"
| 35 || May 14 || @ Marlins || 3–2 || Lincoln (3–0) || Sánchez (2–1) || Hanrahan (7) || 25,666 || 17–18
|-  style="background:#fbb;"
| 36 || May 15 || @ Marlins || 2–6 || Johnson (1–3) || Correia (1–4) || — || 24,242 || 17–19
|-  style="background:#fbb;"
| 37 || May 16 || @ Nationals || 4–7 || Gonzalez (5–1) || Bédard (2–5) || Rodríguez (9) || 25,942 || 17–20
|-  style="background:#cfc;"
| 38 || May 17 || @ Nationals || 5–3 || McDonald (3–2) || Zimmermann (2–4) || Hanrahan (8) || 25,757 || 18–20
|-  style="background:#fbb;"
| 39 || May 18 || @ Tigers || 0–6 || Verlander (5–1) || Morton (2–4) || — || 41,661 || 18–21
|-  style="background:#cfc;"
| 40 || May 19 || @ Tigers || 4–3 || Burnett (2–2) || Smyly (1–1) || Hanrahan (9) || 42,953 || 19–21
|-  style="background:#fbb;"
| 41 || May 20 || @ Tigers || 3–4 || Scherzer (3–3) || Correia (1–5) || Benoit (1) || 39,971 || 19–22
|-  style="background:#cfc;"
| 42 || May 21 || Mets || 5–4 || Hughes (1–0) || Rauch (3–3) || Hanrahan (10) || 14,556 || 20–22
|-  style="background:#fbb;"
| 43 || May 22 || Mets || 2–3 || Dickey (6–1) || Cruz (1–1) || Francisco (11) || 15,794 || 20–23
|-  style="background:#fbb;"
| 44 || May 23 || Mets || 1–3 || Niese (3–2) || Morton (2–5) || Francisco (12) || 25,731 || 20–24
|-  style="background:#cfc;"
| 45 || May 25 || Cubs || 1–0 || Burnett (3–2) || Dempster (0–3) || Hanrahan (11) || 29,914 || 21–24
|-  style="background:#cfc;"
| 46 || May 26 || Cubs || 3–2 || Hanrahan (2–0) || Dolis (2–4) || — || 38,132  || 22–24
|-  style="background:#cfc;"
| 47 || May 27 || Cubs || 10–4 || Bédard (3–5) || Garza (2–3) || — || 27,486 || 23–24
|-  style="background:#cfc;"
| 48 || May 28 || Reds || 4–1 || McDonald (4–2)|| Arroyo (2–3) || Hanrahan (12) || 14,792 || 24–24
|-  style="background:#fbb;"
| 49 || May 29 || Reds || 1–8 || Bailey (4–3) || Morton (2–6) || — || 12,077 || 24–25
|-  style="background:#cfc;"
| 50 || May 30 || Reds || 2–1 || Burnett (4–2) || Cueto (5–3)|| Hanrahan (13)|| 16,782 || 25–25
|-

|-  style="background:#cfc;"
| 51 || June 1 || @ Brewers || 8–2 || Correia (2–5) || Wolf (2–5)  || — || 33,055 || 26–25
|-  style="background:#fbb;"
| 52 || June 2 || @ Brewers || 1–5 || Marcum (4–3) || Bédard (3–6) || — || 39,603 || 26–26
|-  style="background:#cfc;"
| 53 || June 3 || @ Brewers || 6–5 || McDonald (5–2) || Fiers (1–1) || Hanrahan (14) || 34,334 || 27–26
|-  style="background:#cfc;"
| 54 || June 5 || @ Reds || 8–4 || Burnett (5–2) || Bailey (4–4) || Hanrahan (15) || 19,906 || 28–26
|-  style="background:#fbb;"
| 55 || June 6 || @ Reds || 4–5 || Cueto (6–3) || Lincoln (3–1) || Chapman (6) || 16,859 || 28–27
|-  style="background:#cfc;"
| 56 || June 7 || @ Reds || 5–4 (10) || Hanrahan (3–0) || Chapman (4–1) || Resop (1) || 23,106 || 29–27
|-  style="background:#cfc;"
| 57 || June 8 || Royals || 4–2 || Bédard (4–6)|| Hochevar (3–7) || Hanrahan (16) || 36,069 || 30–27
|-  style="background:#cfc;"
| 58 || June 9 || Royals || 5–3 || Hughes (2–0) || Mazzaro (2–1) || Hanrahan (17) || 39,312 || 31–27
|-  style="background:#cfc;"
| 59 || June 10 || Royals || 3–2 || Burnett (6–2) || Chen (5–6)|| Grilli (1) || 25,752 || 32–27
|-  style="background:#fbb;"
| 60 || June 12 || @ Orioles || 6–8 || Chen (6–2) || Lincoln (3–2) || Johnson (19) || 15,618 || 32–28
|-  style="background:#fbb;"
| 61 || June 13 || @ Orioles || 1–7 || Arrieta (3–8) || Correia (2–6) || — || 23,238 || 32–29
|-  style="background:#fbb;"
| 62 || June 14 || @ Orioles || 6–12 || Hunter (3–3) || Bédard (4–7) || — || 29,995 || 32–30
|-  style="background:#fbb;"
| 63 || June 15 || @ Indians || 0–2 || Masterson (3–6) || McDonald (5–3) || Perez (21) || 31,920 || 32–31
|-  style="background:#cfc;"
| 64 || June 16 || @ Indians || 9–2 || Burnett (7–2) || Jiménez (6–5) || — || 30,408 || 33–31
|-  style="background:#cfc;"
| 65 || June 17 || @ Indians || 9–5 || Watson (4–0) || Gómez (4–6) || — || 27,388 || 34–31
|-  style="background:#cfc;"
| 66 || June 19 || Twins || 7–2 || Correia (3–6) || Diamond (5–3) || — || 19,936 || 35–31
|-  style="background:#fbb;"
| 67 || June 20 || Twins || 1–2 || Burton (1–0) || Grilli (1–2) || Perkins (1) || 19,878 || 35–32
|-  style="background:#cfc;"
| 68 || June 21 || Twins || 9–1 || McDonald (6–3) || Hendriks (0–4) || — || 21,563 || 36–32
|-  style="background:#cfc;"
| 69 || June 22 || Tigers || 4–1 || Burnett (8–2) || Fister (1–4) || Hanrahan (18) || 37,965 || 37–32
|-  style="background:#cfc;"
| 70 || June 23 || Tigers || 4–1 || Lincoln (4–2) || Scherzer (6–5) || Hanrahan (19) || 38,734 || 38–32
|-  style="background:#fbb;"
| 71 || June 24 || Tigers || 2–3 || Verlander (8–4) || Resop (0–3) || — || 35,179 || 38–33
|-  style="background:#fbb;"
| 72 || June 25 || @ Phillies || 3–8 || Blanton (7–6) || Karstens (0–2) || — || 44,721 || 38–34
|-  style="background:#fbb;"
| 73 || June 26 || @ Phillies || 4–5 || Worley (4–4) || Bédard (4–8) || Papelbon (18) ||  45,096 || 38–35
|-  style="background:#cfc;"
| 74 || June 27 || @ Phillies || 11–7 || McDonald (7–3) || Valdés (2–1) || — || 44,057 || 39–35
|-  style="background:#cfc;"
| 75 || June 28 || @ Phillies || 5–4 || Burnett (9–2) || Kendrick (2–8) || Hanrahan (20)|| 44,521 || 40–35
|-  style="background:#cfc;"
| 76 || June 29 || @ Cardinals || 14–5 || Correia (4–6) || Wainwright (6–8) || — || 45,382 || 41–35
|-  style="background:#cfc;"
| 77 || June 30 || @ Cardinals || 7–3 || Karstens (1–2) || Lynn (10–4) || Hughes (1) || 37,162 || 42–35
|-

|-  style="background:#fbb;"
| 78 || July 1 || @ Cardinals || 4–5 || Westbrook (7–6) || Bédard (4–9) || Motte (17) || 37,821 || 42–36
|-  style="background:#cfc;"
| 79 || July 2 || Astros || 11–2 || McDonald (8–3) || Lyles (2–5) || — || 21,041 || 43–36
|-  style="background:#cfc;"
| 80 || July 3 || Astros || 8–7 || Hanrahan (4–0) || Wright (0–2) || — || 21,516 || 44–36
|-  style="background:#cfc;"
| 81 || July 4 || Astros || 6–4 || Correia (5–6) || Keuchel (1–1) || Hanrahan (21) || 36,827 || 45–36
|-  style="background:#cfc;"
| 82 || July 5 || Astros || 2–0 || Karstens (2–2) || Norris (5–6) || Hanrahan (22) || 21,386 || 46–36
|-  style="background:#fbb;"
| 83 || July 6 || Giants || 5–6 || Zito (7–6) || Bédard (4–10) || Romo (5) || 37,565 || 46–37
|-  style="background:#cfc;"
| 84 || July 7 || Giants || 3–1 || McDonald (9–3) || Vogelsong (7–4) || Hanrahan (23) || 37,543 || 47–37
|-  style="background:#cfc;"
| 85 || July 8 || Giants || 13–2 || Burnett (10–2) || Lincecum  (3–10) || — || 28,954 || 48–37
|-  style="background:#fbb;"
| 86 || July 13 || @ Brewers || 7–10 || Rodríguez (2–4) || Watson (4–1) || — || 35,025 || 48–38
|-  style="background:#cfc;"
| 87 || July 14 || @ Brewers || 6–4 || Correia (6–6) || Loe (4–3) || Hanrahan (24) || 42,029 || 49–38
|-  style="background:#fbb;"
| 88 || July 15 || @ Brewers || 1–4 || Gallardo (8–6) || Burnett (10–3) || Axford (16) || 35,430 || 49–39
|-  style="background:#fbb;"
| 89 || July 16 || @ Rockies || 4–5 || Brothers (5–2) || Grilli (1–3) || — || 36,907 || 49–40
|-  style="background:#cfc;"
| 90 || July 17 || @ Rockies || 6–2 || Bédard (5–10) || Friedrich (5–7) || Hanrahan (25) || 42,574 || 50–40
|-  style="background:#cfc;"
| 91 || July 18 || @ Rockies || 9–6 || McDonald (10–3) || Reynolds (3–1) || Hanrahan (26) || 30,842 || 51–40
|-  style="background:#cfc;"
| 92 || July 20 || Marlins || 4–3 || Correia (7–6) || Nolasco (8–8) || Hanrahan (27) || 37,193 || 52–40
|-  style="background:#cfc;"
| 93 || July 21 || Marlins || 5–1 || Burnett (11–3) || Zambrano (5–8) || Lincoln (1) || 39,411 || 53–40
|-  style="background:#cfc;"
| 94 || July 22 || Marlins || 3–0 || Karstens (3–2) || Sánchez (5–7) || Hanrahan (28) || 34,203 || 54–40
|-  style="background:#fbb;"
| 95 || July 23 || Cubs || 0–2 || Samardzija (7–8) || Bédard (5–11) || Mármol (12) || 27,586 || 54–41
|-  style="background:#fbb;"
| 96 || July 24 || Cubs || 1–5 || Maholm (9–6) || McDonald (10–4) || — || 32,497 || 54–42
|-  style="background:#cfc;"
| 97 || July 25 || Cubs || 3–2 || Correia (8–6) || Dempster (5–5) || Hanrahan (29) || 33,935 || 55–42
|-  style="background:#cfc;"
| 98 || July 26 || @ Astros || 5–3 || Burnett (12–3) || Keuchel (1–3) || Hanrahan (30) || 19,926 || 56–42
|-  style="background:#cfc;"
| 99 || July 27 || @ Astros || 6–5 || Watson (5–1) || Cruz (1–1) || Hanrahan (31) || 24,685 || 57–42
|-  style="background:#cfc;"
| 100 || July 28 || @ Astros || 4–3 || Resop (1–3) || Fick (0–1) || Grilli (2) || 34,146 || 58–42
|-  style="background:#fbb;"
| 101 || July 29 || @ Astros || 5–9 || Harrell (8–7) || McDonald (10–5) || — || 20,453 || 58–43
|-  style="background:#fbb;"
| 102 || July 30 || @ Cubs || 4–14 || Germano (1–1) || Bédard (5–12) || — || 33,337 || 58–44
|-  style="background:#cfc;"
| 103 || July 31 || @ Cubs || 5–0 || Burnett (13–3) || Coleman (0–2) || — || 33,158 || 59–44
|-

|-  style="background:#cfc;"
| 104 || Aug 1 || @ Cubs || 8–4 || Karstens (4–2) || Wood (4–7) || — || 33,014 || 60–44
|-  style="background:#fbb;"
| 105 || Aug 3 || @ Reds || 0–3 || Latos (10–3) || Rodríguez (7–10) || Chapman (24) || 40,829 || 60–45
|-  style="background:#fbb;"
| 106 || Aug 4 || @ Reds || 4–5 || Broxton (2–2)|| Hughes (2–1) || Chapman (25) || 41,577 || 60–46
|-  style="background:#cfc;"
| 107 || Aug 5 || @ Reds || 6–2 || Burnett (14–3) || Bailey (9–7) || Hanrahan (32) || 38,624 || 61–46
|-  style="background:#cfc;"
| 108 || Aug 6 || Diamondbacks || 4–0 || Bédard (6–12) || Miley (12–7) || — || 24,213 || 62–46
|-  style="background:#fbb;"
| 109 || Aug 7 || Diamondbacks || 4–10 || Ziegler (5–1) || Grilli (1–4) || — || 22,655 || 62–47
|-  style="background:#cfc;"
| 110 || Aug 8 || Diamondbacks || 7–6 || Correia (9–6) || Kennedy (10–9) || Hanrahan (33) || 25,175 || 63–47
|-  style="background:#fbb;"
| 111 || Aug 9 || Diamondbacks || 3–6 || Saunders (6–8) || Rodríguez (7–11) || Putz (21) || 20,558 || 63–48
|-  style="background:#fbb;"
| 112 || Aug 10 || Padres || 8–9 || Brach (1–2) || Watson (5–2) || Street (21) || 38,702 || 63–49
|-  style="background:#fbb;"
| 113 || Aug 11 || Padres || 0–5 || Marquis (8–10) || Burnett (14–4) || — || 39,485 || 63–50
|-  style="background:#cfc;"
| 114 || Aug 12 || Padres || 11–5 || Bédard (7–12) || Ohlendorf (4–3) || — || 35,352 || 64–50
|-  style="background:#fbb;"
| 115 || Aug 13 || Dodgers || 4–5 || Harang (8–7) || Karstens (4–3) || Jansen (24) || 24,670 || 64–51
|-  style="background:#fbb;"
| 116 || Aug 14 || Dodgers || 0–11 || Billingsley (9–9) || Correia (9–7) || — || 22,729 || 64–52
|-  style="background:#fbb;"
| 117 || Aug 15 || Dodgers || 3–9 || Kershaw (11–6) || Rodríguez (7–12) || — || 26,522 || 64–53
|-  style="background:#cfc;"
| 118 || Aug 16 || Dodgers || 10–6 || Burnett (15–4) || Blanton (8–11) || — || 25,073 || 65–53
|-  style="background:#cfc;"
| 119 || Aug 17 || @ Cardinals || 2–1 || McDonald (11–5) || Westbrook (12–9) || Hanrahan (34) || 38,689 || 66–53
|-  style="background:#fbb;"
| 120 || Aug 18 || @ Cardinals || 4–5 || Browning (1–2) || Bédard (7–13) || Motte (28) || 40,313 || 66–54
|-  style="background:#cfc;"
| 121 || Aug 19 || @ Cardinals || 6–3 (19) || Rodríguez (8–12) || Browning (1–3) || — || 43,412 || 67–54
|-  style="background:#fbb;"
| 122 || Aug 20 || @ Padres || 1–3 || Vólquez (8–9) || Correia (9–8) || Thayer (7) || 20,401 || 67–55
|-  style="background:#fbb;"
| 123 || Aug 21 || @ Padres || 5–7 (10) || Mikolas (2–1) || McCutchen (0–1) || — || 21,882 || 67–56
|-  style="background:#fbb;"
| 124 || Aug 22 || @ Padres || 2–4 || Werner (1–0) || McDonald (11–6) || Layne (1) || 20,311 || 67–57
|-  style="background:#fbb;"
| 125 || Aug 24 || Brewers || 5–6 || Fiers (7–6) || Rodríguez (8–13) || Loe (2) || 37,197 || 67–58
|-  style="background:#cfc;"
| 126 || Aug 25 || Brewers || 4–0 || Karstens (5–3) || Marcum (5–4) || — || 37,460 || 68–58
|-  style="background:#fbb;"
| 127 || Aug 26 || Brewers || 0–7 || Rogers (2–1) ||Bédard (7–14) || — || 36,626 || 68–59
|-  style="background:#fbb;"
| 128 || Aug 27 || Cardinals || 3–4 || Lohse (14–2) || Burnett (15–5) || Motte (31) || 16,700 || 68–60
|-  style="background:#cfc;"
| 129 || Aug 28 || Cardinals || 9–0 || McDonald (12–6) ||Westbrook (13–10) || — || 17,492 || 69–60
|-  style="background:#cfc;"
| 130 || Aug 29 || Cardinals || 5–0 || Rodríguez (9–13) || Kelly (4–6) || — || 19,398 || 70–60
|-  style="background:#fbb;"
| 131 || Aug 31 || @ Brewers || 3–9 || Rogers (3–1) || Karstens (5–4) || — || 33,877 || 70–61
|-

|-  style="background:#fbb;"
| 132 || Sep 1 || @ Brewers || 2–3 || Axford (5–7) || Hanrahan (4–1) || — || 32,060 || 70–62
|-  style="background:#fbb;"
| 133 || Sep 2 || @ Brewers || 8–12 || Loe (5–4) || McDonald (12–7) || Axford (23) || 32,728 || 70–63
|-  style="background:#fbb;"
| 134 || Sep 3 || Astros || 1–5 || González (1–0) || Locke (0–1) || — || 20,055 || 70–64
|-  style="background:#cfc;"
| 135 || Sep 4 || Astros || 6–2 || Rodríguez (10–13) || Lyles (3–11) || — || 12,785 || 71–64
|-  style="background:#cfc;"
| 136 || Sep 5 || Astros || 6–3 || Correia (10–8) || Abad (0–3) || — || 14,159 || 72–64
|-  style="background:#fbb;"
| 137 || Sep 7 || Cubs || 2–12 || Wood (5–11) || Burnett (15–6) || — || 32,699 || 72–65
|-  style="background:#fbb;"
| 138 || Sep 8 || Cubs || 3–4 || Samardzija (9–13) || Grilli (1–5) || — || 35,661 || 72–66
|-  style="background:#fbb;"
| 139 || Sep 9 || Cubs || 2–4 || Russell (7–1) || Grilli (1–6) || Mármol (18) || 28,671 || 72–67
|-  style="background:#fbb;"
| 140 || Sep 10 || @ Reds || 3–4 (14) || Simón (3–2) || van den Hurk (0–1) || — || 16,577 || 72–68
|-  style="background:#fbb;"
| 141 || Sep 11 || @ Reds || 3–5 || Leake (8–9) || Correia (10–9) || Broxton (24) || 19,620 || 72–69
|-  style="background:#fbb;"
| 142 || Sep 12 || @ Reds || 1–2 || Bailey (11–9) || Burnett (15–7) || Hoover (1) || 21,203 || 72–70
|-  style="background:#fbb;"
| 143 || Sep 14 || @ Cubs || 4–7 || Rusin (1–2) || McDonald (12–8) || Mármol (20) || 26,946 || 72–71
|-  style="background:#cfc;"
| 144 || Sep 15 || @ Cubs || 7–6 || Rodríguez (11–13) || Berken (0–1) || Hanrahan (35) || 32,774 || 73–71
|-  style="background:#fbb;"
| 145 || Sep 16 || @ Cubs || 9–13 || Beliveau (1–0) || Hughes (2–2) || — || 33,559 || 73–72
|-  style="background:#cfc;"
| 146 || Sep 17 || @ Cubs || 3–0 || Correia (11–9) || Wood (6–12) || Hanrahan (36) || 33,017 || 74–72
|-  style="background:#fbb;"
| 147 || Sep 18 || Brewers || 0–6 || Gallardo (16–8) || Burnett (15–8) || — || 15,492 || 74–73
|-  style="background:#fbb;"
| 148 || Sep 19 || Brewers || 1–3 || Estrada (4–6) || McPherson (0–1) || Axford (30) || 15,337 || 74–74
|-  style="background:#fbb;"
| 149 || Sep 20 || Brewers || 7–9 || Parra (2–3) || Resop (1–4) || Axford (31) || 14,697 || 74–75
|-  style="background:#fbb;"
| 150 || Sep 21 || @ Astros || 1–7 || Rodriguez (2–10) || Locke (0–2) || — || 17,093 || 74–76
|-  style="background:#fbb;"
| 151 || Sep 22 || @ Astros || 1–4 || Keuchel (3–7) || Correia (11–10) || López (7) || 17,185 || 74–77
|-  style="background:#cfc;"
| 152 || Sep 23 || @ Astros || 8–1 || Burnett (16–8) || Lyles (4–12) || — || 15,207 || 75–77
|-  style="background:#fbb;"
| 153 || Sep 24 || @ Mets || 2–6 || Mejía (1–1) || McPherson (0–2) || — || 22,072 || 75–78
|-  style="background:#cfc;"
| 154 || Sep 25 || @ Mets || 10–6 || Rodríguez (12–13) || McHugh (0–3) || — || 25,286 || 76–78
|-  style="background:#fbb;"
| 155 || Sep 26 || @ Mets || 0–6 || Hefner (3–7) || Locke (0–3) || — || 22,890 || 76–79
|-  style="background:#fbb;"
| 156 || Sep 27 || @ Mets || 5–6 || Dickey (20–6) || Correia (11–11) || Parnell (5) || 31,506 || 76–80
|-  style="background:#fbb;"
| 157 || Sep 28 || Reds || 0–1 || Bailey (13–10) || Burnett (16–9) || — || 34,796 || 76–81
|-  style="background:#cfc;"
| 158 || Sep 29 || Reds || 2–1 || Hanrahan (5–1) || Broxton (4–4) || — || 38,623 || 77–81
|-  style="background:#fbb;"
| 159 || Sep 30 || Reds || 3–4 || Marshall (5–5) || Hanrahan (5–2) || Chapman (37) || 32,814 || 77–82
|-

|-  style="background:#cfc;"
| 160 || Oct 1 || Braves || 2–1 || Locke (1–3) || Maholm (13–11)  || Hughes (2) || 15,009 || 78–82
|-  style="background:#cfc;"
| 161 || Oct 2 || Braves || 5–1 || Correia (12–11) || Hanson (13–10) || — || 15,727 || 79–82
|-  style="background:#fbb;"
| 162 || Oct 3 || Braves || 0–4 || Avilán (1–0) || Burnett (16–10) || — || 20,615 || 79–83
|-

|- style="text-align:center;"
| Legend:       = Win       = Loss       = PostponementBold = Pirates team member

Season standings

NL Central standings

NL Wild Card

Record vs. opponents

Detailed records

Roster

Opening day lineup

Notable achievements

Awards
2012 Major League Baseball All-Star Game
Joel Hanrahan, P, reserve
Andrew McCutchen, OF, reserve

Golden Glove Awards
Andrew McCutchen, OF 

Silver Slugger Award
Andrew McCutchen, OF

NL Player of the Month
Andrew McCutchen (June) and (July)

NL Player of the Week
Andrew McCutchen (July 2–8) and (July 9–15)
A. J. Burnett (July 30–August 5)
Pedro Alvarez (August 27–September 2)

Milestones

Statistics
Batters 
Note: G = Games played; AB = At bats; H = Hits; Avg. = Batting average; HR = Home runs; RBI = Runs batted in

Pitchers
Note: G = Games pitched; IP = Innings pitched; W = Wins; L = Losses; ERA = Earned run average; SO = Strikeouts

Transactions

Off-season
On November 10, 2011, the Pittsburgh Pirates signed free agent (C) Rod Barajas to a 1 year/$4 million contract with club option for 2013 ($3.5 million with no buyout).
On November 21, 2011, the Pittsburgh Pirates signed free agent (SS) Clint Barmes to a 2 year/$10.5 million contract.
On December 7, 2012, the Pittsburgh Pirates signed free agent (LHP) Érik Bédard to a 1 year/$4.5 million contract.
On December 7, 2011, the Pittsburgh Pirates signed free agent (LF) Nate McLouth to a 1 year/$1.75 million contract.
On December 7, 2011, the Pittsburgh Pirates traded Brooks Pounders and Diego Goris to the Kansas City Royals in exchange for Yamaico Navarro.
On December 12, 2011, the Pittsburgh Pirates re-signed (RHP) Jason Grilli to a 1 year/$1.1 million contract.
On January 13, 2012, the Pittsburgh Pirates re-signed (RHP) Chris Resop to a 1 year/$850,000 contract.
On January 16, 2012, the Pittsburgh Pirates re-signed (RHP) Charlie Morton to a 1 year/$2.445 million contract.
On January 16, 2012, the Pittsburgh Pirates re-signed (RHP) Joel Hanrahan to a 1 year/$4.1 million contract.
On January 16, 2012, the Pittsburgh Pirates re-signed (RHP) Evan Meek to a 1 year/$875,000 contract with $25,000 in performance bonuses.
On January 16, 2012, the Pittsburgh Pirates re-signed (RHP) Jeff Karstens to a 1 year/$3.1 million contract.
On February 16, 2012, the Pittsburgh Pirates re-signed (1B) Casey McGehee to a 1 year/$2.35 million contract.
On February 16, 2012, the Pittsburgh Pirates re-signed (RF) Garrett Jones to a 1 year/$2.25 million contract.
On February 19, 2012, the Pittsburgh Pirates acquired A. J. Burnett and $20 million from the New York Yankees in exchange for Diego Moreno and Exicardo Coyones.
On March 3, 2012, the Pittsburgh Pirates re-signed (LF) Alex Presley, (CF) Andrew McCutchen, (RHP) Bryan Morris, (RHP) Brad Lincoln, (2B-SS) Chase d'Arnaud, (RHP) Chris Leroux, (RHP) Daniel McCutchen, (LHP) Daniel Moskos, (OF) Gorkys Hernández, (SS) Gustavo Nunez, (RHP) James McDonald, (LHP) Jeff Locke, (SS) Jordy Mercer, (3B) Josh Harrison, (LHP) Justin Wilson, (RHP) Kyle McPherson, (1B) Matt Hague, (RHP) Duke Welker, (C) Michael McKenry, (2B) Neil Walker, (LHP) Rudy Owens, (LF) Starling Marte, (LHP) Tony Watson, (RHP) Jared Hughes and (3B) Yamaico Navarro to 1 year contracts.
On March 4, 2012, the Pittsburgh Pirates re-signed (CF) Andrew McCuchen to a 6 year/$51.5 million contract extension.
On March 30, 2012, the Pittsburgh Pirates traded (RHP) Ryota Igarashi to the Toronto Blue Jays in exchange for a player to be named or cash considerations.

In-season
On May 20, 2012, the Pittsburgh Pirates acquired (2B) Drew Sutton from the Atlanta Braves in exchange for cash considerations.
On May 21, 2012, the Pittsburgh Pirates traded (2B) Drew Sutton to the Tampa Bay Rays in exchange for a player to be named later or cash considerations.
On May 31, 2012, the Pittsburgh Pirates released (LF) Nate McLouth.
On June 24, 2012, the Pittsburgh Pirates claimed (2B) Drew Sutton off waivers from the Tampa Bay Rays.
On July 24, 2012, the Pittsburgh Pirates traded (LHP) Rudy Owens, Colton Cain and (LHP) Robbie Grossman to the Houston Astros in exchange for (LHP) Wandy Rodríguez.
On July 30, 2012, the Pittsburgh Pirates traded (RHP) Brad Lincoln to the Toronto Blue Jays in exchange for (RF) Travis Snider.
On July 31, 2012, the Pittsburgh Pirates traded (1B) Casey McGehee to the New York Yankees in exchange for (RHP) Chad Qualls.
On July 31, 2012, the Pittsburgh Pirates traded (OF) Gorkys Hernández and a 2013 compensation round A draft pick to the Miami Marlins in exchange for (RHP) Gaby Sánchez and Kyle Kaminska.
On August 24, 2012, the Pittsburgh Pirates claimed (RHP) Hisanori Takahashi off waivers from the Los Angeles Angels of Anaheim.
On August 27, 2012, the Pittsburgh Pirates released (LHP) Érik Bédard.
On October 25, 2012, the Pittsburgh Pirates claimed (RHP) Chad Beck from the Toronto Blue Jays and (C) Alí Solís from the San Diego Padres off waivers.
On October 31, 2012, the Pittsburgh Pirates named Jay Bell as hitting coach, Rick Sofield as first base coach and Dave Jauss as major league coach. The Pirates also reassigned Luis Silverio as Senior Advisor, Latin America Operations.

Farm system

LEAGUE CHAMPIONS: DSL Pirates 1, GCL Pirates

References

External links
2012 Pittsburgh Pirates season Official Site
2012 Pittsburgh Pirates season at Baseball Reference
2012 Pittsburgh Pirates season ESPN

Pittsburgh Pirates seasons
Pittsburgh Pirates season
Pitts